Monte Tchota (also: Monte Txota) is a mountain located in the central part of Santiago Island in Cape Verde. Its elevation is 1,041 m. It is part of the Serra do Pico de Antónia Natural Park, and lies 1.5 km southeast of Pico de Antónia, the highest point of the island. The village Rui Vaz lies 3 km to the east.

See also
List of mountains in Cape Verde

References

Tchota
Geography of Santiago, Cape Verde
Ribeira Grande de Santiago
São Lourenço dos Órgãos
São Domingos Municipality, Cape Verde